The 2011 FEI World Cup Finals in Leipzig, Germany were the Final of four World Cups in different Equestrian sports. They were held in the exhibition halls 1 and 3 at the new Leipzig Trade Fair from April 27 to May 1, 2011.

First time ever four horse sport World Cup Finals was held at the same place.

Horse sport in Leipzig 
Since 1998 the new Leipzig Trade Fair is the location of “Partner Pferd“, a trade fair around the horse and a horse show with show jumping and dressage competitions.

First time in 2008 Vaulting competitions are part of the “Partner Pferd“. From 2001 to 2007 also Reining horse show, called “ L.E. Grand Open”, are part of the “Partner Pferd“ Leipzig.

Trade fair and horse show held usually each year in January. In 2011 these events were moved to the end of April.

Disciplines at the World Cup Finals 
Competitions in four equestrian disciplines are part of the FEI World Cup Finals 2011. The finals of the following international series are part of this horse show:
 Dressage:
 Reem Acra FEI World Cup Dressage 2010/2011
 Show jumping:
 Rolex FEI World Cup Jumping 2010/2011
 European Youngster Cup, series for show jumpers up to the age of 25
 Four-in-hand driving:
 FEI World Cup Driving 2010/2011
 Vaulting:
 FEI World Cup Vaulting 2010/2011

At the same time held an international show jumping horse show (CSI 3*) and finals of national series at the “Partner Pferd“ 2011.

Dressage

Qualified riders 

° extra competitor (Extra competitors are riders, who live in a country, which is not part of the World Cup League of the country of this riders nationality. These riders are at first part of the World Cup League of the country in which they live. At the end of the season this riders deducted from the final score of this league. If they have just as many or more points as the last qualified rider, they have the chance to start at the World Cup Final.)

Agenda and results

Grand Prix 
At the evening of April 28, 2011 the Grand Prix de Dressage was held. It was the first competition of the Dressage World Cup final.

Result:

(Top 5 of 17 Competitors)

Grand Prix Freestyle (Final) 
The second competition of the Dressage World Cup final is the Grand Prix Freestyle, held at the evening of Saturday, April 30. The winner of the Grand Prix Freestyle will be the World Cup Champion of the 2010/2011 season.

Result:

Show jumping

Qualified riders (World Cup Final) 

° extra competitor (Extra competitors are riders, who live in a country, which is not part of the World Cup League of the country of this riders nationality. These riders are at first part of the World Cup League of the country in which they live. At the end of the season this riders deducted from the final score of this league. If they have just as many or more points as the last qualified rider, they have the chance to start at the World Cup Final.)

Agenda and results

World Cup 
Last time in 2002 the Show jumping World Cup Final was held in Leipzig.

Final I 
The first competition of the Show Jumping World Cup Final, a speed and handiness competition, was held at Thursday afternoon (April 28, 2011). The result of this competition was converted into faults for the World Cup Final standings.

Result:

(Top Ten of 43 competitors)

Final II 
At April 29 afternoon the second competition of the Show Jumping World Cup Final, a show jumping competition with one jump-off, was held. After the second round, the World Cup Points were converted in Penalties for the Final III.

Result:

(Top Ten of 41 competitors)

Final III 
The third competition of this final was held at May 1, 2011 afternoon. It was a competition over two different rounds, both not against the clock. Here only the 30 best placed riders have the chance to start in this competition.

Result:

(Top 8 of 27 competitors)

Final standings 
The competitor with the smallest number of faults in the World Cup Final standings will be the World Cup Champion of the 2010/2011 season.

ELI = eliminatedDNS = did not startRET = retired

A jump-off was not necessary.

Further competitions

European Youngster Cup-Super Final 
At Friday morning (April 29, 2011) the “Super Final“ of the European Youngster Cup (EY-Cup) season 2010 was held. It was a show jumping competition with one jump-off for riders up to the age of 26.

The chance to start in this final had:
 the best riders of the regular Final of the European Youngster Cup 2010 at the CSI 4* Frankfurt
 the four most successful riders of qualifying competitions in the United States
 the Winner of the Grand Prix of the “Salut-Festival” Aachen (one of the most important show jumping event for young riders in Germany)

result:

(Top 5 of 29 Competitors)

Grand Prix (CSI 3*) 
Also a CSI 3* are held at the “Partner Pferd“ 2011. The Grand Prix of this show jumping horse show was held at the afternoon of Saturday, April 30, 2011. It was a show jumping competition with one jump-off. The fences was up to 1.55 meters.

Result:

(Top 5 of 48 Competitors)

Four-in-hand driving

Qualified driver 
After several World Cup competitions the following drivers have the chance to start in the World Cup Final:

Agenda and results 
Last time in 2008 the Driving World Cup Final was held in Leipzig.

First competition 
At the eventing of April 29, 2011, the first competition of the Driving World Cup final was held. It was a time obstacle driving competition.

Result:

Second competition 
The second competition of the Four-in-hand Driving World Cup final was held at May 1, 2011 noon. This competition was a time obstacle driving with two rounds. The winner of this second competition, Boyd Exell, is the World Cup Champion of the 2010/2011 season.

Result:

Vaulting

Qualified Vaulters 
After four World Cup competitions (Munich, Dresden, Salzburg, Paris) the following vaulters have the chance to start in the World Cup Final:
Women:

Men:

Agenda and results 
The 2010/2011 Vaulting World Cup season was a test season, the first World Cup season ever in Vaulting history.

The World Cup Final consists of two freestyle competitions. Both competitions was held separated by gender. The first competition was held at Friday midday (April 29, 2011), the second competition at Saturday midday (April 30, 2011). The vaulter with the best average of both competition results is the World Cup Champion of the 2010/2011 season.

Women: final result

Men: final result

External links 
 Website of the FEI World Cup Finals (EN Garde Marketing) (German / English)
 Website of the “Partner Pferd” (German)

References 

Dressage World Cup
Show Jumping World Cup
Sports competitions in Leipzig
2011 in German sport
2011 in equestrian
Horse driving competition
Equestrian sports competitions in Germany
International sports competitions hosted by Germany
2010s in Saxony